Voldemar Khristianovich Aussem (in Oryol – 1936), was a Russian nobleman and revolutionary, communist official and Soviet diplomat.

Life 
From 1899 he studied at the Kharkov Institute of Technology until his arrest in 1901, the same year in which he joined the Russian Social Democratic Labour Party, after which he was sentenced to administrative exile in Oryol.

From 1914 until 1917 he served in the Russian Army, and after the October Revolution he served in various capacities of the communist hierarchy in Ukraine. On 30 November 1918 he became Chief of Staff of the Ukrainian Soviet Army, from 19191920 he was in the Revolutionary Military Council.

In 1921 he was posted to Berlin as the Plenipotentiary Representative of the Ukrainian Soviet Socialist Republic to Germany, until 16 July 1923 when the representation was switched to the People's Commissariat of Foreign Affairs, which saw him staying in Germany as Adviser to the Plenipotentiary of the USSR. On 21 May 1924 he was posted to Vienna as Plenipotentiary Representative of the Soviet Union in Austria, and stayed in the Austrian capital until 10 December 1924.

After the completion of his mission in Austria, he returned to the Ukrainian SSR and became Chairman of the Supreme Soviet of the National Economy in that Republic, until 1926 when he became the Trade Representative of the USSR in Turkey.

In December 1927 he was expelled from the All-Union Communist Party (bolsheviks), and at some stage became Scientific Secretary of the Krasnodar Regional Planning Commission until May 1929, when he was arrested, and sentenced in 1930 to 3 years exile in the Kazakh Autonomous Soviet Socialist Republic.

He was released in 1932, and became chief of the Chemical division of the Orlyov Sanitary Biological Institute, until his arrest again on 15 January 1933, whereby he was sentenced to another 3 years of exile in Astrakhan. He was released in 1936.

Aussem disappeared some time in 1937 while some sources claim he was shot.

He was rehabilitated in 1989.

References 

1879 births
Year of death unknown
Ambassadors of the Soviet Union to Austria
Ambassadors of Ukraine to Germany
Expelled members of the Communist Party of the Soviet Union
GRU officers
Kharkiv Polytechnic Institute alumni
Old Bolsheviks
People from Orlovsky Uyezd (Oryol Governorate)
People from Oryol
People from the Russian Empire of German descent
Russian military personnel of World War I
Russian people of German descent
Russian Social Democratic Labour Party members
Soviet people of German descent
Soviet prisoners and detainees
Soviet rehabilitations
Technical University of Braunschweig alumni
Ukrainian revolutionaries